Dyckia ferruginea is a plant species in the genus Dyckia. This species is native to Bolivia.

References

ferruginea
Flora of Bolivia